Sadhu Singh Dharamsot is an Indian politician and former Minister of Forests, Social Welfare in Government of Punjab, India. He is a member of the Indian National Congress. Dharamsot was elected to the Punjab Legislative Assembly from the Nabha constituency of Punjab. Dharamsot had been the five times MLA and former minister in Punjab government.

Member of Legislative Assembly
Dharamsot represented the Nabha Assembly constituency until 2022. He served as the Minister of Forests, Social Welfare in Government of Punjab, India

In the 2022 Punjab Legislative Assembly election he contested from Nabha as a member of the Indian National Congress and was defeated by Aam Aadmi Party's candidate Gurdev Singh Mann by a large margin of 51,554 votes.

Corruption charges
Dharmsot was arrested on 7 June 2022 by the vigilance department of Punjab Police and charged with Prevention of Corruption Act.

References

 

Living people
People from Punjab, India
Indian National Congress politicians from Punjab, India
1960 births
Punjab, India MLAs 2017–2022
Punjab, India MLAs 2012–2017